The Cromer Tunnel was built by the Norfolk and Suffolk Joint Railway to take their Cromer Beach to Mundesley line under the Great Eastern's Cromer High to Norwich line. Both portals of the tunnels are open but undergrowth and modern housing in the area make access difficult.

It is the only standard gauge railway tunnel in Norfolk (the narrow gauge Bure Valley Railway crosses Aylsham Bypass by means of a newly constructed Aylsham Bypass Tunnel which replaces the former level crossing).

See also
Tunnels in the United Kingdom

References

Rail transport in Norfolk
Railway tunnels in England
Buildings and structures in Norfolk
Cromer
Northrepps